SL-8 may refer to:

Kosmos 3 rocket, type 65S3, used from 1966-1968
Kosmos 1 rocket, type 11K65, used from 1964-1965
Heckler & Koch SL8, a semi-automatic rifle
China Railways SL8, a class of steam locomotives operated from 1937-1980